In heraldry, an armiger is a person entitled to use a heraldic achievement (e.g., bear arms, an "armour-bearer") either by hereditary right, grant, matriculation, or assumption of arms. Such a person is said to be armigerous; a family or a clan likewise.

Etymology
The Latin word armiger literally means "arms-bearer". In high and late medieval England, the word referred to an esquire attendant upon a knight, but bearing his own unique armorial device. 

Armiger was also used as a Latin cognomen, and is now found as a rare surname in English-speaking countries.

Modern period
Today, the term armiger is well-defined only within jurisdictions, such as Canada, the Republic of Ireland, Spain and the United Kingdom, where heraldry is regulated by the state or an heraldic body, such as the College of Arms, the Chief Herald of Canada, the Court of the Lord Lyon or the Office of the Chief Herald of Ireland. A person can be so entitled either by proven (and typically agnatic) descent from a person with a right to bear a heraldic achievement, or by virtue of a grant of arms to himself. Merely sharing the same family name of an armiger is insufficient.

Most of the time, the usage of a heraldic achievement is governed by legal restrictions; these restrictions are independent of the copyright status and independent of a coat of arms depiction. A coat of arms represents its owner. Though it can be freely represented, it cannot be appropriated, or used in such a way as to create a confusion with or a prejudice to its owner.

In the Netherlands, titles of nobility are regulated by law but heraldry is not. In Sweden and Finland the nobility has had, since 1762, the prerogative to use an open helmet, while others use a closed helmet.

Further reading

See also
 
 Armigerous clan

References

External links

Heraldry
Heraldry and law